The Yucatan vireo (Vireo magister) is a species of bird in the family Vireonidae.

Closely related to the red-eyed vireo, its plumage a duller overall. It measures . It has a stout, hooked bill that is gray, paler at the base. A broad white eyebrow contrasts with a dull gray crown. A broad dark stripe runs through the brown eye. Upperparts are a dull olive gray. Throat and underparts are whitish. The wings and tail are dark with olive green margins. Legs and feet are grayish blue.

Its natural habitats are subtropical or tropical dry forests, subtropical or tropical mangrove forests, and heavily degraded former forest.

It is found in Belize, Honduras, Mexico, as well as on Grand Cayman.  There is a well-documented record from High Island, Texas, in 1984, but this is the only record for the United States.

Four subspecies are recognized, the large number reflecting its distribution amongst far-flung islands and a small strip of the mainland.
 Vireo magister magister – (Baird, SF, 1871): nominate, found in southeastern Mexico and Belize		
 Vireo magister decoloratus – (Phillips, AR, 1991): found on islands off of northern and central Belize		
 Vireo magister stilesi – (Phillips, AR, 1991): found on islands off of southern Belize and northern Honduras		
 Vireo magister caymanensis – Cory, 1887: found on Grand Cayman Island

References

External links

 Yucatan vireo Image at Animal Diversity Web
 
 
 
 
 
 
 

Yucatan vireo
Birds of Belize
Birds of the Cayman Islands
Birds of Honduras
Birds of the Yucatán Peninsula
Yucatan vireo
Taxonomy articles created by Polbot
Birds of Mexico